Excoecaria aporusifolia is a species of flowering plant in the family Euphorbiaceae. It was described in 1984. It is native to Vietnam.

References

aporusifolia
Plants described in 1984
Flora of Vietnam